Glee: The Music, Volume 7 is the eleventh soundtrack album by the cast of the American musical television series Glee. It was released by Columbia Records on December 6, 2011.

Background
The album was announced as being released in standard and deluxe versions, but only appeared in a standard edition that features fifteen tracks consisting of sixteen covers (one track is a mash-up of two songs by Adele). The version being sold at Target features five bonus tracks for a total of twenty, though it is not marketed as a deluxe edition.

Reception

Heather Phares of AllMusic gave the album a rating of three stars out of a possible five, writing that the show's "music is as reliable as ever, a mix of traditional glee club favorites with some seemingly risky choices thrown in for good measure."

Track listing
Unless otherwise indicated, Information for all the album editions are taken from their respective Liner Notes

Notes
While Jane Lynch and Jayma Mays are listed in the Liner notes’ Glee Cast Vocalists section, their vocals do not appear on this album.
All of the Vocalists on the song “Uptown Girl” are members of a singing group known (on the show) as “The Warblers”.

Personnel

Adele – composer
Dianna Agron – cast, lead vocals
Adam Anders – arranger, digital editing, producer, vocal arrangement, additional vocals
Alex Anders – digital editing, vocal producer, additional vocals
Nikki Anders – additional vocals
Peer Åström – arranger, engineer, mixing, producer
Brock Baker - background vocals (“Uptown Girl”)
Kala Balch – additional vocals
Glen Ballard – composer
Emily Benford – additional vocals
Leonard Bernstein – composer
Dave Bett – creative director
Joshua Blanchard – assistant engineer
PJ Bloom – music supervisor
Steve Bone – assistant engineer
Anita Marisa Boriboon – art direction, design
Ed Boyer – engineer, vocal arrangement
Ben Bram – transcription, background vocals (“Uptown Girl”)
Ravaughn Brown – additional vocals
Geoff Bywater – executive in charge of music
Alvin Chea – background vocals (“Uptown Girl”)
Deyder Cintron – assistant engineer, digital editing, engineer
Chris Colfer – cast, lead vocals
Kamari Copeland – additional vocals
Darren Criss – cast, lead vocals
Tim Davis – vocal contractor, additional vocals
Robert Dietz – editing, background vocals (“Uptown Girl”)
Dante Di Loreto – soundtrack executive producer
Luke Edgemon – background vocals (“Uptown Girl”)
Brad Falchuk – soundtrack executive producer
Tommy Faragher – mixing, producer, vocal arrangement
Berry Gordy Jr. – composer
Lukasz Gottwald – composer
Heather Guibert – coordination
Grant Gustin – lead vocals, background vocals (“Uptown Girl”)
Jon Hall – background vocals (“Uptown Girl”)
James Harris III – composer
Robert Hazard – composer
Fredrik Jansson – assistant engineer
Billy Joel – composer
Beyoncé Knowles – composer
k.d. lang – composer
Storm Lee – additional vocals
David Loucks – additional vocals

Jane Lynch – cast, vocals
Meaghan Lyons – coordination
Dominick Maita – mastering
Chris Martin – composer
Eddie Martin – background vocals (“Uptown Girl”)
Jayma Mays – cast, vocals
Damian McGinty – cast, lead vocals
Kevin McHale – cast, lead vocals
Curt Mega – background vocals (“Uptown Girl”)
Idina Menzel - guest vocals, lead vocals
Lea Michele – cast, lead vocals
Gordon Mills – composer
Alphonzo Mizell – composer
Cory Monteith – cast, lead vocals
Heather Morris – cast, lead vocals
Matthew Morrison – cast, lead vocals
Ryan Murphy – producer
Jeanette Olsson – additional vocals
Chord Overstreet – cast, lead vocals
Adidja Palmer – composer
John Paterno – engineer, mixing
Freddie Perren – composer
Katy Perry – composer
Martin Persson – programming
Zac Poor – additional vocals
Jemain Purifoy – background vocals (“Uptown Girl”)
Nicole Ray – production coordination
Deke Richards – composer
Amber Riley – cast, lead vocals
Naya Rivera – cast, lead vocals
David Lee Roth – composer
Mark Salling – cast, lead vocals
Drew Ryan Scott – additional vocals
Onitsha Shaw – additional vocals
Harry Shum Jr. – cast, lead vocals
Jenny Sinclair – coordination
Scott Smith – assistant engineer
Stephen Sondheim – composer, lyricist
Jenna Ushkowitz – cast, lead vocals
Alex Van Halen – composer
Eddie Van Halen – composer
Windy Wagner – additional vocals
Trevor Wesley – background vocals (“Uptown Girl”)
Dan Wilson – composer
Joe Wohlmuth – engineer

Unless otherwise indicated, Information is taken from Allmusic

Charts

References

2011 soundtrack albums
Columbia Records soundtracks
Glee (TV series) albums